Sego may refer to:

UR-100, a Soviet ICBM 
Ségo, a nickname in the French press for French politician and 2007 Socialist presidential candidate Ségolène Royal
Sego lily, a plant native to the western United States
Sego (diet drink), a discontinued diet drink introduced by Pet Milk in 1961
Sego, Ohio, an unincorporated community
Sego, Utah, a ghost town in the United States

See also
Sego Lily (disambiguation)